Holland Park is an area of Kensington, on the western edge of Central London, that contains a street and public park of the same name. It has no official boundaries but is roughly bounded by Kensington High Street to the south, Holland Road to the west, Holland Park Avenue to the north, and Kensington Church Street to the east. Adjacent districts are Notting Hill to the north, Earl's Court to the south, and Shepherd's Bush to the northwest.

The area is principally composed of tree-lined streets with large Victorian townhouses, and contains many shops, cultural tourist attractions such as the Design Museum, luxury spas, hotels, and restaurants, as well as the embassies of several countries. The street of Holland Park is formed from three linked roads constructed between 1860 and 1880 in projects of master builders William and Francis Radford, who were contracted to build and built over 200 houses in the area. Notable nineteenth-century residential developments in the area include the Royal Crescent and Aubrey House.

History 

The district was rural until the 19th century, and most of the area now referred to by the name Holland Park was formerly the grounds of a Jacobean mansion called Holland House. In the later decades of that century the owners of the house sold off the more outlying parts of its grounds for residential development, and the district which evolved took its name from the house. It also included some small areas around the fringes which had never been part of the grounds of Holland House, notably the Phillimore Estate (there are at least four roads with the word Phillimore in their name) and the Campden Hill Square area.

In the late 19th century a number of notable artists (including Frederic Leighton, P.R.A. and Val Prinsep) and art collectors lived in the area, known as the Holland Park Circle.

Lansdowne House 

Lansdowne House, at Lansdowne Road. is a Grade II listed eight-storey building which was originally constructed in 1902-04 by Scottish architect William Flockhart, for South African mining magnate Sir Edmund Davis. The building contained apartments and artists' workshops.  Among the artists who had studios in the building in the early decades of the 20th century were Charles Ricketts, Charles Haslewood Shannon, Glyn Philpot, Vivian Forbes, James Pryde, and Frederick Cayley Robinson, who are commemorated on a blue plaque on the building.

The building underwent significant alterations. When, in 1957, record producer Denis Preston was looking for a property in which to set up a recording studio, his assistant engineer Joe Meek found the premises, which had unusually high ceilings and a basement squash court, suitable for conversion into a studio. Preston, Meek and engineer Adrian Kerridge then established the studio, and made their first recordings there in 1958. The studio was London's first independent music recording studio. In 1962, an enlarged control room overlooking the studio floor was opened. Kerridge later became the studio's owner. The studios closed in 2006 and the building was subsequently converted into 13 self-contained apartments, while retaining a small recording studio.

The public park 

Holland House is now a fragmentary ruin, having been devastated by incendiary bombing during the Second World War in 1940, but the ruins and the grounds were bought by London County Council in 1952 from the last private owner, the 6th Earl of Ilchester. Today the remains of the house form a backdrop for the open air Holland Park Theatre, which is the home of Opera Holland Park. To the immediate south of the park is the former site of the Commonwealth Institute, now home to the Design Museum.

The park contains a café, as well as the Belvedere Restaurant that is attached to the orangery, a giant chess set, a cricket pitch, tennis courts, two Japanese gardens - the Kyoto Garden (1991) and Fukushima Memorial Garden (2012), a youth hostel, a children's playground, squirrels and peacocks. In 2010, the park set aside a section for pigs whose job was to reclaim the area from nettles etc., in order to create another meadow area for wild flowers and fauna. Cattle were used subsequently to similar effect.

The Holland Park Ecology Centre (2013), operated by the borough's Ecology Service, offers environmental education programs including nature walks, talks, programs for schools and outdoor activity programs for children.

References

External links 

The local council's page on the park
Friends of Holland Park
Opera Holland Park
Holland Park Chess

 
Districts of the Royal Borough of Kensington and Chelsea
Parks and open spaces in the Royal Borough of Kensington and Chelsea
Nature centres in England
Gardens by Capability Brown
Grade II listed parks and gardens in London